The Groom Range is a mountain range in Lincoln County, Nevada. The range was renamed from Naquinta Mountains or Tequima Range in 1864, after Bob Groom, who discovered minerals in the range. It is located within the Nevada Test and Training Range, north of Groom Lake. The highest point in the Groom Range is 9,249 feet. The Groom Range is situated 26.6 miles north of the dry Groom Lake.

See also
Groom Mine

References 

Mountain ranges of Nevada
Mountain ranges of Lincoln County, Nevada